Haruka Kudō may refer to:

Haruka Kudō (singer) (born 1999), Japanese actress, former singer with the group Morning Musume
Haruka Kudō (voice actress) (born 1989), Japanese voice actress